Cornelius F. Desmond Jr. (October 4, 1893 – October 2, 1974) was an American politician who served in the Massachusetts House of Representatives and as City Manager of Lowell, Massachusetts.

Early life
Desmond was born on October 4, 1893 in Pittsfield, Massachusetts.  He attended Lowell public schools and graduated from Lowell High School. An standout baseball player, Desmond went on to for a number of play semi-pro baseball teams.

During World War I, Desmond served in the United States Army. After the war, he worked in the circulation department of newspapers in Boston and New York. In the 1930s, Desmond worked as a supervisor for the Works Progress Administration.

Political career
In 1940, Desmond was elected to the Massachusetts House of Representatives. He would go on to serve a total of 11 terms. He served on a number of important committees, including a stint as chairman of the House Ways and Means Committee.

In 1962, Desmond was named City Manager of Lowell and resigned from the House shortly after that. He served as city manager for 22 months before he reached the mandatory retirement age of 70 and had to leave office.

Later life and death
Desmond remained in Lowell after his retirement. He died on October 2, 1974 at St. John's Hospital in Lowell.

See also
 Massachusetts legislature: 1941–1942, 1943–1944, 1945–1946, 1947–1948, 1949–1950, 1951–1952, 1953–1954, 1955–1956

References

1893 births
1974 deaths
20th-century American politicians
City managers of Lowell, Massachusetts
Democratic Party members of the Massachusetts House of Representatives
Politicians from Pittsfield, Massachusetts
United States Army personnel of World War I